In 2014, following the 2013 Frederikshavn Municipal election, Birgit Hansen, member of Social Democrats (Denmark) became mayor of Frederikshavn Municipality, located in Norhthern Jutland.
She was re-elected in 2017 with her party winning 18 seats, an increase of 4 seats from 2013.
She stood to be elected mayor for a third time in 2021, and succeeded as the Social Democrats (Denmark) maintained it's 18 seats, despite decreasing their vote share by 2.3%.

Electoral system
For elections to Danish municipalities, a number varying from 9 to 31 are chosen to be elected to the municipal council. The seats are then allocated using the D'Hondt method and a closed list proportional representation.
Frederikshavn Municipality had 29 seats in 2021

Unlike in Danish General Elections, in elections to municipal councils, electoral alliances are allowed.

Electoral alliances 

Electoral Alliance 1

Electoral Alliance 2

Electoral Alliance 3

Results

References 

Frederikshavn